Ercolania felina is a minute black species of sacoglossan or sap-sucking sea slug. It is a marine gastropod mollusk in the family Limapontiidae.

Distribution
This marine species occurs off New Zealand.

References

 Hutton, F.W. (1882). Additions to the molluscan fauna of New Zealand. The New Zealand Journal of Science 1 (2): 69.
 Jensen K.R. (2007) Biogeography of the Sacoglossa (Mollusca, Opisthobranchia). Bonner Zoologische Beiträge 55:255–281.
 Spencer, H.G., Marshall, B.A. & Willan, R.C. (2009). Checklist of New Zealand living Mollusca. Pp 196-219. in: Gordon, D.P. (ed.) New Zealand inventory of biodiversity. Volume one. Kingdom Animalia: Radiata, Lophotrochozoa, Deuterostomia. Canterbury University Press, Christchurch.

Further reading 
 Powell A W B, New Zealand Mollusca, William Collins Publishers Ltd, Auckland, New Zealand 1979

External links
 Royal Society of New Zealand
 Seaslugforum
 H.G., Willan R.C., Marshall B.A. & Murray T.J. (2011). Checklist of the Recent Mollusca Recorded from the New Zealand Exclusive Economic Zone.

Limapontiidae
Gastropods of New Zealand
Gastropods described in 1882